This is a list of tennis players who have represented the Israel Davis Cup team in an official Davis Cup match. Israel have taken part in the competition since 1949.

Players

References

Lists of Davis Cup tennis players
Davis Cup
Davis Cup